The Labour and Solidarity Party (PTS) is a social democratic political party in Cape Verde. It is based in São Vicente and led by Gilson Alves.

History
The party was founded by Onésimo Silveira in November 1998. In the buildup to the January 2001 parliamentary elections the party joined the Democratic Alliance for Change (ADM), a coalition including the Democratic and Independent Cape Verdean Union (UCID) and the Democratic Convergence Party (PCD). The alliance received 6% of the vote, winning two seats in the National Assembly. In the presidential elections a month later, ADM candidate Jorge Carlos Fonseca finished third of the four candidates with 3% of the vote.

In the 2004 local elections the party received 11% of the vote in São Vicente, winning one seat on the Municipal Council and two seats in the Municipal Assembly. The PTS did not contest the 2006 parliamentary elections, but ran in the 2011 elections. It received only 1,040 votes (0.5%), failing to win a seat.

Results

National Assembly elections

References

Labour parties
Political parties established in 1998
Political parties in Cape Verde
1998 establishments in Cape Verde